Kahn-e Mahalleh-ye Bala (also Romanized as Kahn-e Maḩalleh-ye Bālā; also known as Kahn-e Maḩalleh, Kahn Maḩal, Kahn Mahalleh, and Kohan Maḩalleh) is a village in Rud Ab-e Sharqi Rural District, Rud Ab District, Narmashir County, Kerman Province, Iran. At the 2006 census, its population was 81, in 20 families.

References 

Populated places in Narmashir County